Bosphorus Gaz Corporation is a gas importer and distributor in Turkey. It controls about 25% of Turkey's private natural gas market.

The company was established in 2003 in Istanbul. In 2004, Securing Energy for Europe a former subsidiary of the Russian gas company Gazprom, became shareholder in Bosphorus Gaz.  In 2009, Gazprom raised its share in the company from 40% to 51% and then to %71 in 2010. In 2018, Gazprom sold all of its %71 shares in the company to the Şen Group who owned %29 of the shares, making Şen Group's shares add up to a %100.

 

In 2005, Bosphorus Gaz won a tender to resell 750 million cubic meters of the gas purchased by the Turkish energy company BOTAŞ from Gazprom until 2021.

References

External links
 

Oil and gas companies of Turkey
Gazprom subsidiaries
Energy companies established in 2003
Non-renewable resource companies established in 2003
Turkish companies established in 2003